Uğurbəyli (known as Təzəkənd until 1991) is a village and municipality in the Barda Rayon of Azerbaijan. It has a population of 1,799.

References

Populated places in Barda District